Soconusco Municipality is a municipality in Mexico located to the south-east of the State in the Plains of the Sotavento of Veracruz, about  from state capital Xalapa.

Geographic Limits
Soconusco Municipality is delimited to the north by Soteapan Municipality and Chinameca Municipality to the east by Jaltipan de Morelos Municipality, to the south by Texistepec Municipality and Oluta Municipality and to the west by Acayucan Municipality.  It is watered by a creek and tributary creeks of the Chacalapa river, tributary of the Coatzacoalcos river.

Agriculture
It produces principally maize, beans, rice and orange fruit.

Celebrations
Every May in Soconusco there is a celebration in honor of Virgen de la Concepción, and in June there´s a celebration in honor of San Antonio de Padua and in July the biggest celebration is in honor of Santa Ana de mother of the virgin Mary does are the Patrons of the town, in April the 26 there´s a celebration almost like a tradition of choosing the pretties Young Lady of town a couple of them around five choose to participate in the contest to win the crown this is for La Reyna de La Sal (Queen of Pink Salt) and a couple of young males participate in the contest too for one of them to be the Ugly King(El Rey Feo) this all belongs to a tradition in the way of a small town in the outsides of Soconusco. Benito Juarez is a small town with a salt water well, the water from which is boiled to produce Pink Salt, which is rich in sodium and helps to prevent diabetes and other issues. In December there is a celebration in honor of Virgen de Guadalupe.

Weather
The weather in Soconusco Municipality is warm  and wet all year with rains in summer and autumn.

References

External links 

  Municipal Official webpage
  Municipal Official Information

Municipalities of Veracruz